The Birthday Party is a Mickey Mouse short animated film first released on January 2, 1931, as part of the Mickey Mouse film series. It was the twenty-fifth Mickey Mouse short to be produced, the first of that year.

Plot
Minnie Mouse throws a surprise birthday party for Mickey, and he is surrounded by a circle of friends singing and dancing his praises. A pig chef offers him a birthday cake, but Mickey blows so hard that all of the cake ends up on the pig's face.

Mickey opens his present—a small piano, to match Minnie's -- and the two mice play and sing "I Can't Give You Anything but Love, Baby". Then they play "Darktown Strutters' Ball" as the guests dance. After a while, the piano stools take over, and Mickey and Minnie dance as well. Horace Horsecollar and Clarabelle Cow also have a spirited dance break.

Heading to the xylophone, Mickey plays "Home! Sweet Home!" and then accompanies Minnie on "Twelfth Street Rag". The xylophone gets excited and Mickey ends up riding it like a bucking bronco, ending up with a fishbowl over his head.

Production
Mickey Mouse was a little over two years old at this point, having debuted in Steamboat Willie in November 1928. Mickey's "official" birthday changed often -- Walt Disney declared in 1933 that Mickey's birthday was October 1, and in the Mickey Mouse comic strip, Mickey celebrated his 7th birthday on September 28, 1935. Mickey's next birthday cartoon, Mickey's Birthday Party, was released on February 7, 1942. It was not until the early 1970s that Dave Smith of the Walt Disney Animation Studios Archives determined that the date of Steamboat Willie's premiere was November 18, and fixed that as Mickey's official birthday.

Reception
In Mickey's Movies: The Theatrical Films of Mickey Mouse, Gijs Grob writes: "The short's most remarkable feature is a short scene in the beginning, animated by Tom Palmer: Mickey and Minnie bashfully asking each other whether they're fine may constitute the first funny dialogue in Disney history. At least, it's a wonderful example of character animation, elegantly establishing the relationship between the two."

The Film Daily (February 1, 1931): "A Mickey Mouse cartoon in which the animals stage a birthday party, featuring an enormous cake. They go through some clever antics and all in all it is a peppy animated, well up to the standard of the Walt Disney series. The harmony and musical effects override the theme and clutter up the cartoon work unnecessarily in spots, but that seems to be the prevailing idea in cartoons until the exhibs or the public register a definite objection."

Home media
The short was released on December 2, 2002 on Walt Disney Treasures: Mickey Mouse in Black and White.

Television
The short appears in the TV shows The Mickey Mouse Club (Season 2, Episode 22) and Donald's Quack Attack (Season 1, Episode 40).

Voice cast
 Mickey Mouse: Walt Disney
 Minnie Mouse: Marcellite Garner

See also
Mickey Mouse (film series)

References

External links
 
 

Mickey Mouse short films
1930s Disney animated short films
1931 short films
American black-and-white films
1931 animated films
1930s English-language films
Films produced by Walt Disney
American comedy short films
Columbia Pictures short films
Columbia Pictures animated short films
Films directed by Burt Gillett
Films about birthdays
American animated short films
Animated films about mice
1930s American films